Grenville Beardsley II (January 12, 1898 – June 3, 1960) was Attorney General of Illinois from 1959 to 1960.

Early life and education
Beardsley was born in Salem, Iowa, the son of Frank Grenville Beardsley, Ph.D, a Congregationalist minister, evangelist, and author. The younger Beardsley graduated from Knox College in 1917 and enlisted in the United States Army during World War I, and rose to the rank of Captain.

Career
After the war, he graduated with a law degree from John Marshall Law School in Chicago. He became active in Illinois Republican politics, and between World War I and World War II he ran for several offices, including the State Senate and Illinois Attorney General.

Beardsley was a member of the draft board during World War II and at 44 years old reenlisted in the army as a major. He served in North Africa, the Middle East and India. He was primarily stationed in New Delhi with the Army Judge Advocate General's Corps, and rose to the rank of lieutenant colonel. He was awarded the Legion of Merit.

After the war, he returned home to his family in Chicago to practice law. He remained in the Army Reserve, was commandant of JAG officer's school at Northwestern University, and was promoted to full colonel. Beardsley remained active in politics and ran for several offices, including State's Attorney. The Chicago Tribune named him the winner, making him the first Republican to win a countywide office in several decades. The election was overturned in a disputed recount. He gained notoriety representing the State of Illinois versus the Illinois Central Railroad. As a result of the case the state was awarded several million dollars of back taxes.

He joined the attorney general's office of Illinois as first assistant attorney general, and was appointed Attorney General of Illinois in 1959.

Personal life
In 1960 he had an aneurysm at his desk in the old State of Illinois Building on LaSalle Street, and died on June 3, a few days later. He was married to Leona Murray Beardsley and had a son, Frank Grenville Beardsley (III). He was a descendant of William Beardsley of Stratford, Connecticut.

Notes

People from Henry County, Iowa
Lawyers from Chicago
Illinois Attorneys General
Knox College (Illinois) alumni
1898 births
1960 deaths
Recipients of the Legion of Merit
20th-century American politicians
20th-century American lawyers